Temple Emanu-El is a Reform synagogue in Long Beach, New York.
It is located at 455 Neptune Boulevard.

Prominent members 
 Billy Crystal attended as a boy and celebrated his Bar Mitzvah there.

External links
 Temple Emanu-El page on Facebook

References

Synagogues in Nassau County, New York
Reform synagogues in New York (state)